Dominion High School is a public secondary school in Sterling, an unincorporated area in Loudoun County, Virginia, United States. Dominion High School first opened in 2003, receiving students from Potomac Falls High School and Park View High School. Dominion's student body live primarily in the communities of Sugarland Run and Lowes Island.

Profile
Dominion High School is a fully accredited high school based on the Standards of Learning tests in Virginia. For the 2022–2023 school year, Dominion's student body is 39% Hispanic, 36% White, 15% Asian, 6% Black, and 4% Other.

In 2005, Dominion was the host of the Loudoun Academy of Science, a part-time magnet school program for Loudoun County students. In 2018, the Academy of Science moved out of Dominion and formed the Academies of Loudoun.

Student life
The Dominion sports teams play in Conference 21 and Region 4A. The Titans girls' soccer team won the AAAA state championship in soccer in 2014. In 2016, the boys' lacrosse team won the state championship. In the Spring of 2021, the Titans won three class 4 state championships.

In 2009, the school joined the Cappies Awards Program of the Northern Virginia/DC Metro Area.

DHS Press is the official Dominion news organization. In 2017, the PBS Student Reporting Labs partnered with Dominion, and in 2021, two students were listed on their "list of 20 up-and-coming journalists."

Notable alumni
 Meggie Meidlinger, Class of 2006, women's national baseball player

References

Public high schools in Virginia
Schools in Loudoun County, Virginia
2003 establishments in Virginia
Educational institutions established in 2003